Paratropidia is a subgenus of hoverflies from the family Syrphidae, in the order Diptera.

Species
Orthoprosopa alex (Thompson, 1972)
Orthoprosopa bilineata (Walker, 1849)
Orthoprosopa margarita (Thompson, 1972)
Orthoprosopa multicolor (Ferguson, 1926)
Orthoprosopa pacifica (Hippa, 1980)

References

Diptera of Australasia
Eristalinae
Taxa named by Frank Montgomery Hull
Insect subgenera